Travis Austin Greaves (born May 13, 1983) is an American lawyer who serves as a judge of the United States Tax Court.

Education 

Greaves received his Bachelor of Arts from the University of Tennessee, his Juris Doctor, cum laude, from the South Texas College of Law, and a Master of Laws in taxation, with distinction, from the Georgetown University Law Center.

Legal and academic career 

Greaves was previously a partner at Greaves & Wu, LLP, in Washington, D.C. He also served as an adjunct professor at Georgetown University Law Center and as an attorney advisor at the U.S. Tax Court. Prior to his judicial appointment, he served as the Deputy Assistant Attorney General for Appellate and Review in the U.S. Department of Justice's Tax Division.

Tax Court service 

On August 28, 2018, President Donald Trump nominated Greaves to serve as a Judge of the United States Tax Court. He was nominated to the seat vacated by Juan F. Vasquez, who assumed senior status on June 24, 2018. On January 3, 2019, his nomination was returned to the President under Rule XXXI, Paragraph 6 of the United States Senate.

On February 6, 2019, his re-nomination was sent to the Senate. On July 24, 2019, a hearing on his nomination was held before the Senate Finance Committee. On July 31, 2019, his nomination was unanimously reported favorably by the Senate Finance Committee. On February 25, 2020, the Senate invoked cloture on his nomination by a 91–5 vote. On February 27, 2020, his nomination was confirmed by a 85–3 vote. He was sworn in on March 9, 2020 for a term ending March 8, 2035.

References

External links 
 

1983 births
Living people
21st-century American lawyers
21st-century American judges
Georgetown University Law Center alumni
Judges of the United States Tax Court
Lawyers from Washington, D.C.
South Texas College of Law alumni
Texas lawyers
United States Article I federal judges appointed by Donald Trump
United States Department of Justice lawyers
University of Tennessee alumni